Igreja de Santa Maria do Castelo  is a church in Tavira, Portugal. It is classified as a National Monument.

It is believed this church was built in the 13th century after the Reconquista of the city of Tavira from Moors. The church was built as an initiative of the Order of Santiago (1242) by D. Paio Peres Correia to replace the Arab mosque that existed here. The mosque is believed to have served the Medina (fortified city) of Tavira. The mosques existence hasn't been proven archaeologically. However, in 1718, a tomb was found with a corpse and an Alfange (type of Moorish sword). At the time, it was decided to bury it again with the Alfange.

See also
 Tavira
 List of former mosques in Portugal

References

Churches in Faro District
National monuments in Faro District
Former mosques in Portugal